Heather Williams may refer to:
 Heather Stevens née Williams, a character on the American soap opera The Young and the Restless
 Heather A. Williams, professor of Africana Studies at the University of Pennsylvania
 Heather Williams (biologist) (born 1955), American ornithologist and professor at Williams College
 Heather Williams (physicist) (born 1977), British medical physicist
 Heather Williams (singer) (born 1976), American singer-songwriter
 Tui T. Sutherland (born 1978), children's book author who has also written under the pen name Heather Williams